Stefan Georgiev (born 28 July 1955) is a Bulgarian former swimmer. He competed in two events at the 1976 Summer Olympics.

References

1955 births
Living people
Bulgarian male swimmers
Olympic swimmers of Bulgaria
Swimmers at the 1976 Summer Olympics